Darren James Kellett (born 27 September 1972 in Auckland) is a New Zealand-born Samoan rugby union player. He plays as a fly-half.

Career
His first international cap was during a match against Tonga, at Nuku'alofa, on 29 May 1993. He was part of the 1995 Rugby World Cup roster, where he played two matches. His last international cap was during a match against England, at Twickenham, on 16 December 1995.

External links

Darren James Kellett at New Zealand Rugby History

1972 births
Living people
Rugby union players from Auckland
Samoan rugby union players
Samoan people of New Zealand descent
New Zealand sportspeople of Samoan descent
Rugby union fly-halves
Samoa international rugby union players